Jacques "Jim" Blain (born July 19, 1947) is a Canadian former professional ice hockey defenceman.

During the 1972–73 season, Blain played 70 games in the World Hockey Association with the Quebec Nordiques.

References

External links

1947 births
Living people
Canadian ice hockey defencemen
Beauce Jaros players
Greensboro Generals (SHL) players
Laval Titan coaches
London Nationals players
Long Island Ducks (ice hockey) players
Maine Nordiques players
Niagara Falls Flyers players
Ottawa 67's players
Quebec Nordiques (WHA) players
Syracuse Blazers players
Toronto Marlboros players
Tulsa Oilers (1964–1984) players
Vancouver Canucks (WHL) players
Ice hockey people from Gatineau
Canadian expatriate ice hockey players in the United States
Canadian ice hockey coaches